, popularly known as Sasai, is a Japanese-born Indian Buddhist monk who later chose India as his home. He is the president of the Dr. Babasaheb Ambedkar Memorial committee Deekshabhoomi.

Early years
Surai Sasai was born in Niimi, Okayama Prefecture, with the lay name Minoru Sasai on 30 August 1935.
He took tonsure as a novice monk at the age of 14 and was given the ordination name Tenjit Surai, "Light of the Sun, beautiful Mountain Peak", by his Tendai teacher Shujuma Yamamoto. In 1955 he joined the monastic order of the Shingon school and in 1966 he travelled to Thailand to study vipassana.

Spreading Buddhism in India
Sasai came to India in 1966 and met Nichidatsu Fujii, whom he helped with the building of a peace pagoda at Rajgir. He fell out with Fuji, however, but he related that on his return journey he was stopped by a vision of a figure resembling Nagarjuna who said, "Go to Nagpur". In Nagpur, he met Wamanrao Godbole, the person who had organized the conversion ceremony for B. R. Ambedkar in 1956. Sasai claims that when he saw a photograph of B. R. Ambedkar at Godbole's home, he realized that Ambedkar had appeared in his dream. At first, Nagpur residents considered Surai Sasai very strange, but he became popular after he began to greet them with "Jai Bhim" (victory to Ambedkar) and to build viharas.

In 1987, Sasai was arrested for overstaying his visum but his followers protested against his planned deportation. A court case to deport him was dismissed and he was granted Indian citizenship, which cost him his Japanese citizenship.

Sasai is one of the main leaders of the campaign to free the Mahabodhi Temple at Bodh Gaya from Hindu control. As the president of the Bodhisatva Nagarjun Smarak Samstha Va Anusandhan Kendra he supported the excavations at Mansar. Sasai represented the Buddhists as a member of the National Commission for Minorities from 2003-2006. Arya Bhadant Surai Sasai is the president of the Dr. Babasaheb Ambedkar Smarak Samiti Deekshabhoomi (Dr. Babasaheb Ambedkar Memorial committee Deekshabhoomi), Nagpur.

Disciples
Sasai has hundreds of  thousands of lay followers and hundreds of ordained monk and novice disciples. His most active disciples are Bhante Bodhi Dhamma (Dhammaji), Prajnasheela Bhikkhu, Ken Bodhi, and Bhikkhu Abhaya Putra. The first and last were trained as Theravada monk and the others as Mahayana monks. Bodhi Dhamma works in South India teaching Zen while Prajnasheela works in central India. Abhaya Putra is the founder of Metta India and trains Theravadin monks and novices of Indian origin in Thailand

See also
Buddhism in India
Buddhist modernism
Dalit Buddhist movement
Navayana

References

Sources 
 
 Enoki, Miki (2010). Role and Network of Buddhist Institution in Bijapur, Karnataka ~ Renaissance of Indian Buddhism, in: Voices for Equity Minority and Majority in South Asia, RINDAS International Symposium Series 1, The Center for the Study of Contemporary India, Ryukoku University , pp. 28–44
 
Joshi, Jagadpati; Sharma, A.K. (2005). Mansar Excavations 1998-2004: The Discovery of Pravarapur, Puramanthana 3, 1-26
Karlsson, Hans (August 12, 2015), Surai Sasai: a Buddhist monk battling the caste dragon, The Japan Times
 Kinnard, Jacob N. (2014), Places in Motion: The Fluid Identities of Temples, Images, and Pilgrims. Oxford University Press, p. 138
 Knopf, Rainer (2000). Bodh-Gaya: Ein internationales Zentrum des Buddhismus in nicht-buddhistischer Umgebung, Internationales Asienforum 31 (3-4), 289-314
 METTA (12 May 2012). Meditation Education Training Treatment Academy Organization. Retrieved 2 February 2014, from Meditation Education Training Treatment Academy Organization
 National Commission for Minorities, Composition of Commission (2003-2006)
 Quadir, Abdul (July 28, 2013). Mahabodhi temple serial blasts: NIA in a fix over Sasai's quizzing, Times of India

External links
Photos by Christina Sjögren

1935 births
Indian Buddhist monks
Indian people of Japanese descent
Japanese Buddhist clergy
Japanese expatriates in Thailand
Living people
People from Okayama Prefecture
Naturalised citizens of India
Japanese emigrants to India
20th-century Indian monks
Shingon Buddhist monks